The Morane-Saulnier MS.180 is a single engine, single parasol wing aerobatic trainer designed in France in 1929. About seventeen were produced and used in French flying clubs, some surviving World War II and one remaining in use at a club until the 1970s. Before World War II, some were used by Spanish Republican forces to train pilots in the Spanish Civil War. Two MS.181s are still flying.

Design and development

Morane-Saulnier were well known for their series of parasol wing fighter aircraft.  The MS.180 was in that tradition but was designed as an aerobatics trainer, a single seat near contemporary of the two seat but otherwise similar Morane-Saulnier MS.230, somewhat smaller and much lower powered. The aircraft is built from a mixture of wood and metal and, apart from the forward fuselage, is fabric covered. Its swept wing has metal spars and ailerons but wooden ribs. It is carried over the fuselage on inverted V-form metal cabane struts and braced to the lower fuselage with parallel pairs of metal lift struts. The forward fuselage is metal framed and clad but structurally wooden aft. The cockpit is below the wing trailing edge, with a large cut-out for visibility. The tail unit is metal framed, with the tailplane on top of the fuselage,  The fin has a rounded leading edge and the rudder extends to the bottom of the fuselage, moving between separate elevators.  The MS.180 ha a fixed, conventional undercarriage with single mainwheels mounted on V-form struts hinged to the lower fuselage.  The shock absorber legs are near vertical and attached to the forward lift struts; these latter are further braced to the upper fuselage at the leg attachment points.  A tailskid completes the landing gear.

The MS.180 first flew in 1929, powered by a 40 hp (30 kW) Salmson 9Ad  9-cylinder radial engine of 3.65 L (227 cu in) capacity. Later aircraft, designated MS.181, were powered by the larger capacity (5.1 L, 315 cu in) 60 hp (40 kW) Salmson 5Ac 5-cylinder radial.  Reconstructions of the French civil aircraft register suggest that only one MS.180 was built and that later converted to the more powerful engine.

Operational history

In all, about 17 examples of the MS.180 and its variants were produced, mostly MS.181s. Fifteen MS.181s were owned by Compagnie Française d'Aviation and used in its flying schools from 1930. One was still flying with them in the 1970s.  Four of them were acquired by the Republican air force in 1937 for pilot training early in the Spanish Civil War.

Variants

MS.180
Prototype with 40 hp (30 kW) Salmson 9Ad  9-cylinder radial engine. One built, converted to MS.181.
MS.181
Production version with 60 hp (40 kW) Salmson 5Ac 5-cylinder radial engine. About 15 built.
MS.185
One built.

Survivors
Two MS.180-series aircraft are still flying in France. MS.181 N304JX/F-AJXN, previously at EAA AirVenture Oshkosh is privately owned. The MS.185 F-AZAZ is in the Amicale Jean-Baptiste Salis collection at Cerny and is also on display.

The Salis collection has another, non-flying MS.181, though it is not on general display. The Museo del Aire at Cuatro Vientos near Madrid displays a non-flying MS.181 marked up in Spanish Republican Air Force colours.

Operators

Spanish Republican Air Force

Specifications (MS.180)

See also

References

Further reading

External links

MS.180
Aerobatic aircraft